A corn burrito is a Mexican-style dish consisting of a small rolled-up corn tortilla filled with refried beans. The filled tortilla is typically deep-fried, then topped with hot sauce and cheese. A corn burrito is essentially the same thing as a taquito, the difference being that taquitos are typically filled with meat, whereas a corn burrito is always filled with refried beans.

Corn burritos are usually topped with cheese, lightly salted, and served with a mild red sauce, sour cream, or guacamole. Traditional sauce is a base of tomato and water with 1/3 onion and yellow pepper all blended together, salted to taste.  

Although corn burritos are cheap and easy to make, they typically cost more than one would think, and this is partially attributed to the usability of the frying oil after preparation. Unlike meat filling, the refried bean filling easily falls out the end of the rolled tortilla, quickly contaminating the remainder of the oil which then requires frequent cleaning and relatively frequent changing.

Locale
Although the idea of filling a rolled up tortilla with refried beans may be a common one, the term "Corn Burritos" is typically well known to the locals of Ventura County, California, USA, and they can be found at many Mexican fast food restaurants in the Ventura County, California area.

May 15th, 2018 was coined National Corn Burrito Day in Ventura, California and was celebrated with both local Yelp members and members of the Facebook page I Love Corn Burritos at Foster Freeze in Ventura, California.   Lisa Mckinnon a reporter for the Ventura County Star’s Food & Lifestyle column attended.

References
https://www.youtube.com/watch?v=ouh3tofTB34 
http://archive.vcstar.com/lifestyle/taco-usa-author-to-discuss-history-of-mexican-food-in-ventura-beyond-ep-363023743-351943651.html/
http://www.cornburritos.com

External links
Photo of Corn Burritos at Flickr
Ventura County Reporter, meet the infamous 10 corn burritos
CornBurritos.com: listings, photos, and reviews of restaurants where authentic Corn Burritos are served.
I love Corn Burritos Facebook Group.

Cuisine of the Southwestern United States
Tortilla-based dishes